The Great South Gate is a historical gate in West Central District, Tainan, Taiwan.

History
The Great South Gate is part of the original 14 gates of Tainan City Wall built in 1736. The gates were constructed to fend off barbarians from attacking the town.

Architecture
The gate has an outer arched fate in the shape of half moon. It was set at an angle to the inner gate because of security considerations.

See also
 List of tourist attractions in Taiwan

References

1736 establishments in Taiwan
Gates in Tainan